10th Street may refer to:
Tenth Street Freedman's Town (United States historic place)
Tenth Street, Atlanta
 10th Street (Manhattan), an east–west street from the West Village neighborhood of the New York City borough of Manhattan to Avenue D in the East Village
 10th Street (Metro Transit station), a planned light rail stop along the Central Corridor line in downtown Saint Paul, Minnesota
 10th Street Middle School, a middle school in Tulalip, Washington, United States incorporating grade levels 6-8
 Tenth Street Promenade station, a peoplemover station in the Brickell district of Downtown Miami
 10th Street galleries, an American artist collective

See also
Tenth Avenue (disambiguation)